Greg M. Glienna (born in Chicago, Illinois, August 23, 1963) is an American director and screenwriter best known as the creator of the original 1992 film Meet the Parents. Glienna also wrote A Guy Thing and wrote and directed Relative Strangers. He is also the co-author (with Mary Ruth Clarke) of the play Suffer the Long Night which had its Los Angeles premiere August 2008.

Filmography

Writer
 Slutvinka: With Love, from Russia! (2013)
 The Coin Machine (2012) 
 Little Fockers (2010) (characters)
 The Elevator (2010)
 Relative Strangers (2006) (screenplay) (story)
 Meet the Fockers (2004) (characters)
 A Guy Thing (2003) (screenplay) (story)
 Meet the Parents (2000) (1992 screenplay) (story)
 Desperation Boulevard (1998)
 Meet the Parents (1992)

Director
 Slutvinka: With Love, from Russia! (2013)
 The Coin Machine (2012) 
 The Elevator (2010)
 Relative Strangers (2006)
 Desperation Boulevard (1998)
 The Can Man (1992)
 Meet the Parents (1992)

Actor
 Slutvinka: With Love, from Russia! (2013)
 The Coin Machine (2012) 
 The Elevator (2010)
 Desperation Boulevard (1998)
 Meet the Parents (1992)

Producer
 The Elevator (2010)
 Meet the Parents (2000)

References

External links
 
 
 Wisconsin Public Television's Director's Cut episode on Greg Glienna - "Meet the Parents"

American male screenwriters
American male film actors
Film producers from Illinois
1963 births
Writers from Chicago
People from Park Ridge, Illinois
Living people
Artists from Park Ridge, Illinois
Film directors from Illinois
Screenwriters from Illinois